Agostino Cusani (1542–1598) was a Roman Catholic cardinal.

References

1542 births
1598 deaths
16th-century Italian cardinals